Near Dark is a 1987 American neo-Western horror film co-written and directed by Kathryn Bigelow (in her solo directorial debut), and starring Adrian Pasdar, Jenny Wright, Bill Paxton, Lance Henriksen and Jenette Goldstein. The plot follows a young man in a small Oklahoma town who becomes involved with a family of nomadic American vampires.

Despite performing poorly at the box office, critic reviews were generally positive. Over the years, the film has gained a cult following.

Plot
One night, Caleb Colton, a young man in a small town, meets an attractive young drifter named Mae. Just before sunrise, she bites him on the neck and runs off. The rising sun causes Caleb's flesh to smoke and burn. Mae arrives with a group of roaming vampires in an RV and takes him away. The most psychotic of the vampires, Severen, wants to kill Caleb but Mae reveals that she has already turned him. Their charismatic leader, Jesse Hooker, reluctantly agrees to allow Caleb to remain with them for a week to see if he can learn to hunt and gain the group's trust. Caleb is unwilling to kill to feed, which alienates him from the others. To protect him, Mae kills for him and then has him drink from her wrist.

Jesse's group enters a bar and kills the occupants. They set the bar on fire and flee the scene. All except Mae want to kill Caleb after he endangers them by letting the only living occupant escape, but after Caleb endangers himself to help them escape their motel room during a daylight police raid, Jesse and the others are grateful and temporarily mollified. A camaraderie commences, with Caleb asking Jesse how old he is and Jesse responding that he "fought for the South" (during the American Civil War, 1861-1865), making him about 150 years old (Severen had earlier suggested he and Jesse started the Great Chicago Fire of 1871).

Meanwhile, Caleb's father has been searching for Jesse's group. A child vampire in the group, Homer, meets Caleb's sister, Sarah, and wants to turn her into his companion, but Caleb objects. While the group argues, Caleb's father arrives and holds them at gunpoint, demanding that Sarah be released. Jesse taunts him into shooting him, then regurgitates the bullet before wrestling the gun away. In the confusion, Sarah opens a door, letting in the sunlight and forcing the vampires back. Burning, Caleb escapes with his family.

Caleb suggests they try giving him a blood transfusion. The transfusion unexpectedly reverses Caleb's transformation. That night, the vampires search for Caleb and Sarah. Mae distracts Caleb by trying to persuade him to return to her while the others kidnap his sister. Caleb discovers the kidnapping and his tires slashed but gives chase on horseback. When the horse shies and throws him, he is confronted by Severen. Caleb commandeers a tractor-trailer and runs Severen over. The injured vampire suddenly appears on the hood of the truck and manages to rip apart the wiring in the engine. Caleb jackknifes the vehicle and jumps out as the truck explodes, killing Severen. Seeking revenge, Jesse and his girlfriend, Diamondback, pursue him but are forced to escape in their car as dawn breaks.

Attempting to save Sarah, Mae breaks out of the back of the car with her. Mae's flesh begins to smoke as she is burned by the sun but she carries Sarah into Caleb's arms, taking refuge under his jacket. Homer attempts to follow, but as he runs he dies from exposure to the sun. Their sunproofing ruined, Jesse and Diamondback also begin to burn. They attempt to run Caleb and Sarah over but fail, dying as the car blows up. Mae awakens later, her burns now healed. She too has been given a transfusion and is cured. She and Caleb comfort each other in a reassuring hug as the film ends.

Cast

 Adrian Pasdar as Caleb Colton
 Jenny Wright as Mae
 Lance Henriksen as Jesse Hooker
 Bill Paxton as Severen
 Jenette Goldstein as Diamondback
 Joshua John Miller as Homer
 Marcie Leeds as Sarah Colton
 Tim Thomerson as Loy Colton
 Troy Evans as Plainclothes Police Officer
 Roger Aaron Brown as Cajun Truck Driver
 James LeGros as Teenage Cowboy
 Billy Beck as Motel Manager
 S.A. Griffin as Police Officer at Motel
 Neith Hunter as Lady in Truck
 Theresa Randle as Lady in Truck

Near Dark features three actors from Aliens, two of whom (Paxton and Henriksen) had also previously been in The Terminator and the other of whom (Goldstein) would later be in Terminator 2: Judgment Day. However, there is also a much more obscure casting connection between Near Dark and the Terminator movies: Robert Winley, who played a biker in the bar scene in Near Dark, and who had never been in any James Cameron movies at that time, later played the biker whose clothes, boots, and motorcycle are stolen by the T-800 in a very similar bar scene at the beginning of Terminator 2. His characters are identified in the credits as "Patron in bar" for the former movie and "Cigar Biker" for the latter.

Production
Vampire films had become "trendy" by the time of Near Darks production, with the success of Fright Night (1985) and The Lost Boys (1987), the latter released two months before Near Dark and grossing $32 million.
Kathryn Bigelow wanted to film a Western movie that departed from cinematic convention. When she and co-writer Eric Red found financial backing for a Western difficult to obtain, it was suggested to them that they try mixing a Western with another, more popular genre. Her interest in revisionist interpretation of cinematic tradition led her and Red to combine two genres that they regarded as ripe for reinterpretation: the Western movie and the vampire movie. The combination of the genres had been visited at least twice before on the big screen, with Curse of the Undead (1959) and Billy the Kid Versus Dracula (1966).

Bigelow knew (and later married) director James Cameron, who directed Aliens (1986), a film that shares three cast members (Paxton, Goldstein and Henriksen) with Near Dark. Actor Michael Biehn was offered the role of Jesse Hooker, but he rejected the role because he found the script confusing. Lance Henriksen took over the role. A cinema seen in the background early in the film has Aliens on its marquee and Cameron played the man who "flips off" Severen.

SoundtrackNear Dark''' is the thirty-second major release and tenth soundtrack album by Tangerine Dream. It was released in 1988.

ReleaseNear Dark was released on October 2, 1987, in 262 theaters, grossing US$635,789 on its opening weekend. It went on to make $3.4 million, below its $5 million budget.

Critical response
Part of a late 1980s revival of serious vampire depictions on the big screen, it received mostly positive reviews for its mix of the Western, biker and vampire movie genres. On the review aggregator website Rotten Tomatoes, Near Dark holds an 82% approval rating based on 74 critic reviews with an average rating of 7.3/10. The consensus reads: "Near Dark is at once a creepy vampire film, a thrilling western, and a poignant family tale, with humor and scares in abundance.”

In her review for The New York Times, Caryn James wrote, "Ms. Bigelow's too-studied compositions – Caleb in silhouette riding a horse toward the camera – clash with her unstudied approach to the characters' looks". Jonathan Rosenbaum of the Chicago Reader was impressed by Bigelow's first foray into big budget films with the "hillbilly vampire" movie, describing it as "beautifully shot". Hal Hinson of The Washington Post said the intermixing of vampire legends, westerns and biker movies has a result that is "both outrageous and poetic; it has extravagant, bloody thrills plus something else – something that comes close to genuine emotion". In his review for The Globe and Mail, Jay Scott wrote, "Bill Paxton as the undead sex symbol – is exceptional, but not exceptional enough to put across the cop-out that concludes the film".

Richard Corliss of Time magazine called Near Dark "weird (and) beautiful" and "the all-time teenage vampire love story". Richard Schickel (also of Time) considered the film a clever variant of the vampire film genre. Peter Travers of Rolling Stone concurred, calling it "gory and gorgeous". Alan Jones of Radio Times awarded it four stars out of five, calling it a "1980s horror landmark" and "one of the best vampire movies ever made." Jones described it as a  "visually stunning and frightening package, spinning a genuinely scary tale" and highlighted the "stand-out degenerate performances" of Henriksen and Paxton.

Cancelled remake
A remake of the film was announced in October 2006 as a co-production between film companies Rogue Pictures and Platinum Dunes, with Samuel Bayer attached to direct. In December 2008, Platinum Dunes producer Bradley Fuller stated that the project had been put on hold due to similarities in conception with Twilight (2008), a film which also contained a romance between human and vampire characters.

References

Further reading
 Auerbach, Nina. Our Vampires, Ourselves''. University of Chicago Press, 1995. p. 137.

External links

 
 
 
 
 
 
 Bright Lights Film Journal essay

1987 films
1987 horror films
1980s Western (genre) horror films
1980s chase films
1980s supernatural horror films
American Western (genre) horror films
American chase films
American supernatural horror films
De Laurentiis Entertainment Group films
1980s English-language films
Films directed by Kathryn Bigelow
Films produced by Steven-Charles Jaffe
Films scored by Tangerine Dream
Films set in Kansas
Films set in Oklahoma
Films shot in California
Films shot in Oklahoma
Neo-Western films
American vampire films
1980s American films